Andrzej Szczepaniec (born 10 May 1952) is a Polish former ice hockey player. He played for Podhale Nowy Targ, GKS Katowice, and HC Ambrì-Piotta during his career. Szczepaniec won the Polish league championship with Podhale in both 1971 and 1972. He also played for the Polish national team at the 1972 Winter Olympics and the 1973 and 1976 World Championships.

References

External links
 

1952 births
Living people
GKS Katowice (ice hockey) players
HC Ambrì-Piotta players
Ice hockey players at the 1972 Winter Olympics
Olympic ice hockey players of Poland
People from Nowy Targ
Podhale Nowy Targ players
Polish ice hockey defencemen
Sportspeople from Lesser Poland Voivodeship
Polish expatriate sportspeople in Switzerland